Kosta Koça (born 11 March 1934) is an Albanian former footballer and coach who was also a national champion in cross country running, 400, 800 and 1500 meters as well as a two time national boxing champion.

Club career
He spent his entire playing career with Skënderbeu Korçë and he also managed the club.

Honours
Albanian Superliga: 1
 1949

References

1934 births
Living people
Footballers from Korçë
Albanian footballers
Association footballers not categorized by position
KF Skënderbeu Korçë players
Kategoria Superiore players
Albanian football managers
KF Skënderbeu Korçë managers